"Oh Heart" is a debut song written by Kathie Baillie, Michael Bonagura and Don Schlitz, and recorded by American country music group Baillie & the Boys.  It was released in June 1987 as the first single from the album Baillie & the Boys.  The song reached #9 on the Billboard Hot Country Singles & Tracks chart.

Chart performance

References

1987 debut singles
Baillie & the Boys songs
Songs written by Don Schlitz
Song recordings produced by Kyle Lehning
RCA Records singles
Songs written by Michael Bonagura
1987 songs